Ján Čarnogurský (born 1 January 1944) is a Slovak former politician, who served as the prime minister of Slovakia (1991–1992) and the former chairman of the Christian Democratic Movement (1990–2000). Today he is chairman of Slovak-Russian association with headquarters in Bratislava.

He is married and has four children.

Before 1989 
He studied law at the Charles University in Prague (graduation in 1969) and at the Comenius University in Bratislava (Doctor's degree in 1971). From 1970 to 1981, first he was active as a junior attorney-at-law, then as an attorney-at-law in Bratislava, and was member of a section of the Center of Czech and Slovak attorneys-at-law. In 1981, he was deprived of his attorney-at-law licence by the Communist authorities, because he had defended a person in a political process. However, he continued to provide legal advice to opposition (Charta 77) and religious activists. Between 1982 and 1986 first he was active as a driver, then as a company lawyer. In 1987 he was fired and remained unemployed.  He was an important figure in the secret church in Slovakia and, between 1987 and 1989, he published illegally the magazine Bratislavské listy (Bratislava Papers). He represented the Christian Democratic wing within the Anti-Communist opposition in Czechoslovakia.

1989–1992 
Shortly before the Velvet Revolution, on 14 August 1989, he was imprisoned and released only after the collapse of the Communist regime through a presidential amnesty on 25 November 1989. From December 1989 to April 1990 he was the first vice-prime minister, since April to June 1990 the vice-prime minister of Czechoslovakia. He was a co-founder and, since February 1990, the chairman of the Christian Democratic Movement of Slovakia. Since the Christian Democratic Movement was Slovakia's second largest party after the 1990 Slovak parliamentary election, Čarnogurský became the vice-prime minister of Slovakia and in June 1990. After the Movement for a Democratic Slovakia split from the Public against Violence, i.e. from the party that had won the 1990 elections, Čarnogurský took over the post of the prime minister of Slovakia in April 1991.

During this period characterized by quarrels between Czechs and Slovaks concerning the future of their co-existence he became famous by his statement that in the future Slovakia should have its own "little [European] star" in Europe, which at the time of existence of Czechoslovakia was a shocking statement.

1992–2002 
After the 1992 election he ceased to be prime minister and was a deputy to the National Council of the Slovak Republic (Slovak parliament) as an opposition member and strong Mečiar opponent from 1992 to 1998.

After the 1998 election he was the Minister of Justice of Slovakia from 1998 to 2002.

After 2002 
In 2002, he retired from politics altogether and has been working as an attorney-at-law since. Pavol Hrušovský became the new chairman of the Christian Democratic Movement after him.

Secondary functions 
February 1990 – August 1990: chairman of the Legislative Council of the Czechoslovak government
2–22 November 1990: temporary leader of the Ministry of the Interior of Slovakia
1990–1991: chairman of the Slovak government Council for Information Policy and Mass media and chairman of the Slovak government Council for Nationalities and Ethnic Groups
1993–1994: vice-chairman of the Parliamentary Assembly of the CSCE
December 1994 – October 1998: member of the Permanent Delegation of the National Council of the Slovak Republic at the Parliamentary Assembly of the CSCE
1991–(?)1998: member of the Permanent Delegation of the National Council of the Slovak Republic at the Parliamentary Assembly of the OSCE
1997 – ? (1998?/2002?): vice-president of the European Union of Christian Democrats (EUCD)
2002 – Member of the Advisory Board of the Global Panel Foundation – a NGO which works behind the scenes in crisis areas around the world. Global Panel has offices and satellites in Berlin, Copenhagen, New York, Prague, Sydney and Toronto. 
Other Advisory Board Members include George Robertson (former NATO Secretary General and UK Defense Minister), Barbara McDougall (Former Minister of Foreign Affairs and Finance, Canada) and Stuart Eizenstat (former Deputy Treasury Secretary, Under-Secretary of State and Ambassador under President Bill Clinton) among others.

He is Knight of Honor of the Order of St. George.

Works 
 Trpeli za vieru (They suffered for the faith; 1991)
 Videné od Dunaja (Seen from the Danube; 1997): his speeches and articles 
 The Fall of Communism in Czechoslovakia

References 

1944 births
Living people
Foreign Ministers of Slovakia
Politicians from Bratislava
Christian Democratic Movement politicians
Prime Ministers of Slovakia
Czechoslovak prisoners and detainees
Prisoners and detainees of Czechoslovakia
Candidates for President of Slovakia
Members of the National Council (Slovakia) 1992-1994
Members of the National Council (Slovakia) 1994-1998
Charles University alumni